Daniel Estulin (August 29, 1966) is a Lithuanian-born conspiracy theorist whose main interest is the Bilderberg Group, an annual invitation-only conference of the elites in the fields of business, finance, media, military and politics. He is known for his extensive works on this group, having written a book called "The True Story of the Bilderberg Group", as well as for his live seminars throughout the world.
Estulin wrote The True Story of the Bilderberg Group (original title:  La Verdadera Historia del Club Bilderberg), purportedly a report on the nature and meetings of the world’s most powerful people. According to Estulin's book, the secretive Bilderbergers have been making major political, economical and social decisions since their first gathering in 1954.

Commenting on an episode in this book, Bruce Ramsey wrote "The method here is to initiate the reader into a special group of in-the-know; of mixing facts with assertions so that the casual reader won’t tell them apart, and to draw lines between A and B, when A is the person you want to impeach and B is a known wickedness."

Estulin published a second book, Los secretos del club Bilderberg, released in September 2006, described by Fidel Castro as a "fantastic story". On August 19, 2010, the Cuban state news agency Prensa Latina published the full text of a "reflection" by former President Fidel Castro which was devoted to quoting Estulin from Los secretos del club Bilderberg, on the topic of "The World Government." The selected quotes from Estulin's book focused on material credited to Lyndon LaRouche and members of his movement.

Italian MEP Mario Borghezio invited Estulin to address the European Parliament in 2011.

Bibliography

English-language books

.

Tavistock Institute: Social Engineering the Masses. Waterville, OR, USA: Trine Day. 2015 .

Spanish-language books

DVD video
 Shadow government: how the global elite plan to destroy democracy and your freedom, by Grant R Jeffrey; Katherine Albrecht; Edward G Griffin; Daniel Estulin; Gary Kah; Chuck Missler; Joan Veon; Bradley S O'Leary.  Publisher: United States: Cloud Ten Pictures, 2009. OCLC 466168154.

References

External links

"Bilderberg 2007 - Towards a One World Empire?"
 A series of interviews with Estulin on Youtube
 Official website of the Bilderberg conference 

Living people
Writers from Vilnius
1966 births
Conspiracy theorists
Lithuanian writers